Sam Riviere (born 1981) is an English poet and publisher.

Education and career 
Riviere was educated at Norwich School of Art and Design and completed a PhD in Creative Writing at the University of East Anglia in 2013. While at art school, Riviere played drums in indie band Le Tetsuo.

He won an Eric Gregory Award in 2009, and the Forward Prize for Best First Collection in 2012 for 81 Austerities.

Since 2015 he has run the independent press If a Leaf Falls Press in Edinburgh, which "publishes limited-edition pamphlets, typically of appropriated or procedural writing".

In 2021, Riviere published his first novel, Dead Souls.

Awards
2009 Eric Gregory Award
2012 Forward Prize for Best First Collection

Bibliography

Poetry 
Faber New Poets 7 (Faber & Faber, 2010)
 81 Austerities (Faber & Faber, 2012)
 Standard Twin Fantasy (Egg Box Publishing, 2014)
 Kim Kardashian's Marriage (Faber & Faber, 2015)
 Cont. (If a Leaf Falls Press, 2015)
 The Truth About Cats & Dogs with Joe Dunthorne (Visual Editions, 2016)
 Preferences (If a Leaf Falls Press, 2016)
 True Colours (After Hours, 2016)
 Safe Mode (Test Centre, 2017)
 Darken PDF (Spam Press, 2018)
 Old Poem (A6 Books, 2019)
 Pink Dogs (AFV Press, 2020)
 After Fame (Faber & Faber, 2020)

Fiction 
 Dead Souls (Weidenfeld & Nicolson, 2021)

References

1981 births
Living people
Alumni of Norwich University of the Arts
Alumni of the University of East Anglia
Academics of the University of East Anglia
British poets
British male poets